Dennis George Izon (1 April 1907 – 1967) was an English footballer who played for Port Vale, Hyde United and Stafford Rangers.

Career

Port Vale
Izon played for Rugeley and Colwich before joining Port Vale as an amateur in November 1928. He signed as a professional the next month and made his debut in a 1–0 win over Tranmere Rovers at The Old Recreation Ground on 21 December 1929, taking the place of Clarence Spencer. He was used largely as a back-up player, making four appearances as the "Valiants" won the Third Division North in 1929–30. He played just once in 1930–31, as Vale recorded their highest ever league finish in the Second Division. He featured 12 times in the 1931–32 season, but was then released.

Hyde United
Izon joined Cheshire County League club Hyde United. He scored his first goal in senior football on 1 October 1932, in a 2–1 win over Crewe Alexandra Reserves. He was part of the 1934 Cheshire League Cup final winning team over Stockport County Reserves on 1 May 1934. During six years at Ewen Fields he scored 18 goals in 244 league and cup appearances. He later played for Stafford Rangers.

Career statistics
Source:

Honours
Hyde United
Cheshire League Cup: 1934

References

1907 births
1967 deaths
People from the Borough of Stafford
English footballers
Association football midfielders
Port Vale F.C. players
Hyde United F.C. players
Stafford Rangers F.C. players
English Football League players